Ashley McKenzie (born 17 July 1989) is an English judoka competing at the men's 60 kg division. He was a member of the Great Britain Olympic Judo Team at London 2012 but was defeated in the second round by Hiroaki Hiraoka of Japan. He also appeared in, and made it to the final of Celebrity Big Brother 10 in September 2012. In August 2018, he appeared on the first series of Celebs on the Farm. In January 2020, he appeared on Celebrity Ex on the Beach.

He was part of the Great Britain Olympic Judo Team at Rio 2016; he reached the third round where he was defeated by Yeldos Smetov of Kazakhstan.

Personal life
McKenzie was born in Queen's Park, London. He is mixed-race. He was diagnosed with attention deficit hyperactivity disorder (ADHD) at an early age.

McKenzie was first exposed to judo at the age of 11, when he got into a fight with a boy who stole his Charizard Pokémon card. Determined to get it back he joined the Moberly Judo Club where he met his assailant by chance. He eventually got his card back after befriending the boy.

McKenzie welcomed his first daughter Lana-Rose McKenzie in July 2017 with girlfriend - fellow Judo player and 3 time European champion Automne Pavia.

Ashley is also a brand ambassador for The Money Group, who are sponsoring him for Tokyo 2020.

Career
His achievements include winning gold at the British Open in 2008, 2009, 2010, 2012, and 2015. McKenzie's first foray into the European U23 Championships in 2009 resulted in a bronze medal win at Antalya. In 2010, he became the second British athlete in history to be crowned an under-23 European champion when he competed in Sarajevo. In 2011, McKenzie earned bronze and gold in the European Cup competitions within Orenburg and Hamburg, respectively. He was the 2011 Judo World Cup champion within Poland  and Great Britain. He also earned bronze at the European Championships 2013 in Budapest. 
From 2013 to 2014, he was the back-to-back champion of the Pan-American Open in Uruguay. McKenzie would then achieve gold in the 2014 Commonwealth Games. He competed at the International Judo Federation Grand Slam 2015 in Tyumen where he won silver. McKenzie won bronze at the International Judo Federation Grand Slam 2016 in Baku.

On 15 August 2012, McKenzie entered the Celebrity Big Brother 10 reality TV series. After 24 days McKenzie made it to the final and finished in fifth place.

In May 2019, McKenzie was selected to compete at the 2019 European Games in Minsk, Belarus.

In 2020 he was part of the original cast of the eleventh series of Ex on the Beach UK. In 2023, McKenzie competed on the reality-competition series The Challenge UK.

Achievements
Complete list at judoinside.com

References

External links
 
 
 
 
 

1989 births
Commonwealth Games gold medallists for England
Commonwealth Games medallists in judo
English male judoka
Judoka at the 2012 Summer Olympics
Judoka at the 2016 Summer Olympics
Living people
Olympic judoka of Great Britain
Sportspeople from London
Judoka at the 2014 Commonwealth Games
Judoka at the 2015 European Games
Judoka at the 2019 European Games
European Games competitors for Great Britain
Judoka at the 2020 Summer Olympics
Judoka at the 2022 Commonwealth Games
Medallists at the 2014 Commonwealth Games
Medallists at the 2022 Commonwealth Games